William Yabsley (2 February 1812 – 21 January 1880) was an Australian mixed farmer, shipbuilder and shipowner. Yabsley was born in Plymouth, Devon, England and died by drowning falling overboard into the Richmond River between Lismore and Coraki helping to drive a boat during a flood at sea.

See also

References

Australian Anglicans
Australian people of English descent
1812 births
1880 deaths